Donald Glenn August (born July 3, 1963) is an American former Major League Baseball pitcher who played for the Milwaukee Brewers from  to .  He lived in Mission Viejo, California and graduated from Capistrano Valley High School.

Minor pro career 
August attended Chapman University, where he was a Division II All-American. After competing for the United States at the 1984 Summer Olympics in Los Angeles, he was drafted 17th overall by the Houston Astros. He spent a year in the Astros' minor league system before being traded along with fellow pitcher Mark Knudson to the Brewers on August 15, 1986, in exchange for Danny Darwin.

Milwaukee Brewers 
After beginning 1988 with a 4–1 record and a 3.52 ERA for the Denver Zephyrs (now the New Orleans Zephyrs) of the Pacific Coast League, August was called up to the Brewers. He continued his success at the Major League level, going 13–7 with a 3.09 ERA and ranking ninth in the American League in winning percentage. He finished fourth in the voting for AL Rookie of the Year; Oakland Athletics shortstop Walt Weiss won the award.

August suffered a case of the sophomore jinx in 1989, slipping to 12–12 with a 5.31 ERA. He was sent back down to Denver for some time, where he garnered a 1–1 record with a 4.94 ERA. A notable moment came on June 5, when he was the winning pitcher in the inaugural MLB game played at the SkyDome (now Rogers Centre) in Toronto, a 5–3 Brewers victory over the Toronto Blue Jays.

In 1990, he pitched five games, and had a record of 0–3. He started 23 games during the 1991 season, and had a 9–8 record in his final season.

References

External links

Baseball Almanac: Don August

1963 births
Living people
American expatriate baseball players in Canada
Baseball players at the 1984 Summer Olympics
Baseball players from Inglewood, California
Calgary Cannons players
Chapman Panthers baseball players
Charlotte Knights players
Columbus Astros players
Denver Zephyrs players
London Tigers players
Major League Baseball pitchers
Medalists at the 1984 Summer Olympics
Milwaukee Brewers players
Olympic silver medalists for the United States in baseball
Toledo Mud Hens players
Tucson Toros players
Vancouver Canadians players
Wichita Wranglers players
American expatriate baseball players in Taiwan
American expatriate baseball players in Italy
Jungo Bears players
American expatriate baseball players in Mexico
Pericos de Puebla players
Piratas de Campeche players
Rimini Baseball Club players
Sinon Bulls players
Rakuten Monkeys players
Anchorage Bucs players